Thomas Poge may refer to:

 Thomas Pöge, bobsledder
Thomas Poge (MP) for Nottingham (UK Parliament constituency)